"Thought About You" is a song by American country music singer Tim McGraw. Written by The Warren Brothers (Brad and Brett Warren) and Lee Thomas Miller, the song is McGraw's second released single for Columbia Records Nashville. It is included on the ultimate version of McGraw's fifteenth album Here on Earth.

Content
In 2019, McGraw announced plans to make a new album on Columbia Records Nashville after leaving Arista Nashville. His second single release for the label is "Thought About You", described by the blog The Boot as "an emotional power ballad that takes his listeners through a journey of love, faith, loss, and all the ups and downs that life brings." Following the single release in October 2018, McGraw released a lyric video for the song as well.

Charts

Weekly charts

Year-end charts

References

2019 songs
2019 singles
Tim McGraw songs
Columbia Nashville Records singles
Songs written by Lee Thomas Miller
Songs written by the Warren Brothers
Song recordings produced by Byron Gallimore
Song recordings produced by Tim McGraw